PeaceJam is a US-based global youth organization led by Nobel Peace laureates. It was founded by musical artist Ivan Suvanjieff and his wife, the economist Dawn Engle in 1993.

PeaceJam was nominated for the Nobel Peace Prize eight times.

History 
PeaceJam was founded to serve as an educational outreach program on behalf of Nobel peace prize laureates to youths worldwide. In 2014 they launched their One Billion Acts of Peace campaign internationally that would help bring attention to the most pressing issues facing humanity. Over ninety million peace acts inspired by this campaign have been logged into the company’s website.

Noble Peace Prize Laureates 
The organization is led by 14 Nobel peace prize winners:

 1.	Dalai Lama
 2.	Betty Williams
 3.	Rigoberta Menchu Tum
 4.	Oscar Arias
 5.	Desmond Tutu
 6.	Adolfo Perez Esquivel
 7.	Mairead Maguire 
 8.	Shirin Ebadi
 9.	Jose Ramos-Horta
 10.	Jody Williams
 11.	Sir Joseph Rotblat
 12.	Leymah Gbowee
 13.	Kailash Satyarthi
 14.	Tawakkol Karman

Nobel Legacy Film Series 
The organization also started the production of award-winning documentaries that depict the life of the Nobel Peace laureates: Among them include:
 Shirin Ebadi: Until We Are Free
 The Dalai Lama – Scientist
 Betty Williams: Contagious Courage

 Oscar Arias: Without a Shot Fired

 Rigoberta Menchu: Daughter of the Maya
 Adolfo Perez Esquivel: Rivers of Hope
 Desmond Tutu: ''Children of Light'

See also 
 Dawn Gifford Engle

References

External links
 Official website

Organizations awarded Nobel Peace Prizes
Organizations based in the United States